Ghost in the Shell: SAC 2045 is a Japanese ONA anime series based on the manga of the same name written and illustrated by Masamune Shirow. On April 7, 2017, Kodansha and Production I.G announced that Kenji Kamiyama and Shinji Aramaki would be co-directing a new Kōkaku Kidōtai anime production. On December 7, 2018, it was reported by Netflix that they had acquired the worldwide streaming rights to the series and that it would premiere on April 23, 2020. The series is in 3DCG and Sola Digital Arts collaborated with Production I.G on the project. Ilya Kuvshinov handled character designs. An English dub was not available until May 3 due to the COVID-19 pandemic causing production delays for its recording. It was stated that the series will have two seasons of 12 episodes each, with the second set released on May 23, 2022.


Series overview

Episode list

Season 1 (2020)

Season 2 (2022)

References

Ghost in the Shell: SAC 2045